Telioneura glaucopis is a moth in the subfamily Arctiinae. It was described by Felder in 1869. It is found in the Amazon region.

References

Moths described in 1869
Arctiinae